Arhopala azenia is a butterfly in the family Lycaenidae. It was described by William Chapman Hewitson in 1863. It is found in the Australasian realm.

Subspecies
Arhopala azenia azenia (Aru, Obi, Serang, Waigeu, Misool, Jobi, West Irian to Papua)
Arhopala azenia patsyae Tennent & Rawlins, 2010 (Obi)

References

External links
Arhopala Boisduval, 1832 at Markku Savela's Lepidoptera and Some Other Life Forms. Retrieved June 3, 2017.

Arhopala
Butterflies described in 1863
Taxa named by William Chapman Hewitson
Butterflies of Oceania
Butterflies of Indonesia